Reverend Kenneth Reginald Gunnery Hunt (24 February 1884 – 28 April 1949) was an English amateur football player, Oxford Blue, FA Cup Final goal scorer, England cap holder, and Olympic gold medallist, having competed in the 1908 Summer Olympics and in the 1920 Summer Olympics.

Early life
Kenneth Reginald Gunnery Hunt was born 24 February 1884 in Oxford, the son of an American-born Anglican clergyman, Robert George Hunt. He was educated at Wolverhampton Grammar School, and later, from 1902, Trent College, Nottingham, where he was appointed to the student position of Head of School.
In 1904, he went up to study classics at The Queen's College, Oxford, where he earned four football Blues between 1904 and 1907, but he graduated with only a pass degree.

Footballing career
During his period at Oxford, Hunt played for Corinthian, and Oxford City reserves, where he came to the attention of professional clubs. He started playing for Wolverhampton Wanderers in 1907 whilst still an undergraduate.

Having been part of the Wolverhampton Wanderers team who had won the FA Cup on 25 April 1908 (scoring the opening goal in a 3–1 victory over Newcastle United), he was a member of the English team, which won the gold medal in the 1908 Summer Olympics football tournament.

He also made two appearances for the full England team in 1911 against Wales and Scotland.

He again played in the 1920 Olympic tournament in Antwerp, when England lost in the first round to Norway.

Hunt never drew a salary but instead remained an amateur player throughout his time with Wolverhampton Wanderers.

Later life

In 1909, Hunt fulfilled his childhood desire to become a clergyman when he was ordained as a deacon in the Church of England. He went on to become a master and subsequently a housemaster at Highgate School. He became Housemaster of Grindal House where the House colours are still to this day Black and Gold in tribute to Hunt's playing days at Wolverhampton Wanderers. One of his students at Highgate was Murray Walker. Hunt died 28 April 1949 in Heathfield, just two days before Wolverhampton Wanderers took the FA Cup from Leicester City at Wembley.

Honours
Wolverhampton Wanderers
 FA Cup winner: 1908

Individual

A Blue plaque was erected in Hunt's honour on 28 October 2004 at St Mark's Church, Chapel Ash by Wolverhampton Civic Society and Wolverhampton Wanderers.

References

External links
 Profile on "Wolves' Golden Oldies"
 Wolves profile
 Olympics profile
 FIFA profile
 Biography
 K. R. G. Hunt – Oxford University Association Football Club profile
 

1884 births
1949 deaths
Alumni of The Queen's College, Oxford
20th-century Church of England clergy
English footballers
Footballers at the 1908 Summer Olympics
Footballers at the 1920 Summer Olympics
Wolverhampton Wanderers F.C. players
Corinthian F.C. players
Oxford City F.C. players
Leyton F.C. players
Crystal Palace F.C. players
Olympic footballers of Great Britain
English Olympic medallists
Olympic gold medallists for Great Britain
Oxford University A.F.C. players
England international footballers
England amateur international footballers
Olympic medalists in football
People educated at Wolverhampton Grammar School
English Football League players
English Football League representative players
Medalists at the 1908 Summer Olympics
Association football wing halves
FA Cup Final players